Santha Shishunala Sharifa is a 1990 Indian Kannada biographical drama film directed and co-written by T. S. Nagabharana and produced by Srihari Khoday and Mahima Patel for Yajaman Enterprises. The story is based on the life of acclaimed saint poet Shishunala Sharif who wrote several moral poems striving towards social reformation. A collection of Sharif's poems are set to tunes by C. Ashwath, who also did the major playback singing. The soundtrack consisting of 16 poems was extremely popular upon release. The dialogues for this movie was written by Gopala Wajapayi, a well known theatre figure and translator of Bertolt Brecht's play The Caucasian Chalk Circle.

The film's cast comprised Sridhar in the titular role along with  Girish Karnad, Suman Ranganathan and H. G. Dattatreya, Hema Chaudhary among others.

The film was widely appreciated by critics and audience upon release. It went on to win Nargis Dutt Award for Best Feature Film on National Integration. The film also received multiple Karnataka State Film Awards including Best Film, Best Actor and Best Supporting Actor categories.

Plot
Shishunala Sharif (Shridhar) was born of Muslim parents in Shishuvinahala, a village in Dharwad district of Karnataka in 1829. Shocking both the Hindus and Muslims, he studied under the Hindu Guru Govinda Bhatta (Girish Karnad) and at the same time discovered that Vachana literature and the teaching of mystic saint Allama Prabhu. Under these influences, he composed devotional lyrics which are still sung today. His own philosophy based on Hindu-Muslim unity, discarding the inequalities of caste, creed and religion. Poverty and death of his wife (Suman Ranganathan) made him a wanderer and he toured the country singing his songs. He died in 1889 on his birthday. Today Hindus and Muslims throng to the grave of this saint, who belonged to both religions equally.

Cast 
 Sridhar as Sharifa
 Girish Karnad as Govinda Bhatta
 Suman Ranganathan as Fatima, Sharifa's wife
 H. G. Dattatreya as Imam Sab, Sharifa's Father
 Hema Chaudhary as Hajju Maa, Sharifa's Mother
 Master Jayanth as Child Sharif
 Brahmavar
 Venkata Rao as Mullah Sab
 Vishwanath Rao
 Shankar Rao
 Prem Kumar

Soundtrack 
The music of the film was composed by C. Ashwath. All the 16 songs composed for this film have been from the literary work collection of poet Shishunala Sharif. The songs are rendered by popular Sugama Sangeetha singers with most of them sung by C. Ashwath himself.

Awards
The film has won the following awards since its release.

Indian National Film Awards 1989
 Won – National Film Award for Best Film on National Integration

1989-90 Karnataka State Film Awards (India)
 Won – Karnataka State Film Award for Second Best Film
 Won – Karnataka State Film Award for Best Actor – Sridhar
 Won – Karnataka State Film Award for Best Supporting Actor – Girish Karnad

References

External links 
 
 Karnataka greats & C Aswath cast a spell

1990 films
Films set in the 19th century
Films scored by C. Ashwath
1990s Kannada-language films
Indian biographical drama films
Indian historical drama films
Best Film on National Integration National Film Award winners
1990s biographical drama films
1990s historical drama films
1990 drama films
Films directed by T. S. Nagabharana